Air Component Command (FTS) was a part of the Joint Forces Command of the Swedish Armed Forces. The staff was located at the Swedish Armed Forces Headquarters in Stockholm. The Air Component Command commanded the operations of the Swedish Air Force.

History
On 30 June 1994, the Air Staff was dissolved and ceased as a staff and authority. In its place, on 1 July 1994, the Air Force Command (Flygvapenledningen) was formed in the newly established Swedish Armed Forces Headquarters and the Air Tactical Center (Flygvapnets taktiska centrum) in Linköping. The Air Force Command, which was part of the newly established Swedish Armed Forces Headquarters, was a production unit which sorted directly under the authority of the head of the agency, that is, the Supreme Commander. The Air Force Tactical Center was in turn directly subordinate of the military commander of the Middle Military Area (Milo M).

On 1 July 1998, the Air Force Tactical Center, along with the Air Force Command, was reorganized and formed the Air Force Center (Flygvapencentrum, FlygvapenC) and the Chief of Air Force Staff position was replaced by the Inspector General of the Air Force position on 30 June 1998 who became the commander of the Air Force Center. The Swedish Air Force' highest command was now localized to Uppsala.

The Defence Act of 2000 meant that more than 20 units and some 20 staffs were disbanded which were reduced to six. The Defence Act also resulted in the Air Force Center being disbanded as an independent staff, and instead, the Air Force Center, as of 1 July 2000, came to operate as the Air Force Tactical Command (Flygvapnets taktiska kommando, FTK). The Air Force Tactical Command was one of three tactical commands within the Joint Forces Command (OPIL). On 1 January 2003, the position the Inspector General of the Air Force position was changed to Inspector of the Air Force.

On 1 April 2007, the command was reorganized, and it received it current name was the Air Component Command (Flygvapnets taktiska stab, FTS). The Air Component Command was then organized under Joint Forces Command. In 2007, the Swedish Air Force's highest command was again re-located to Stockholm. Since 1 January 2014, there is once again a position like Chief of Air Force, this time in the Swedish Armed Forces Headquarters's Training & Procurement Staff (Produktionsstaben).

In February 2018, the Swedish Armed Forces proposed in its budget for 2019 to the Government a reorganization of the command structure. The proposal was, among other things, designed with a new command and new organizational units in new locations. This was to provide better conditions for a robust and sustainable command. The new organizational units that the Swedish Armed Forces wanted to form were proposed to be named the Army Staff, the Air Staff and the Naval Staff. These would be formed by a merger of the Training & Procurement Staff and the Joint Forces Command, as well as other complementary parts from the Swedish Armed Forces Headquarters and the Defence Materiel Administration. The staffs were proposed to be formed on 1 January 2019 and commanded by an army chief, a naval chief and an air force chief.

Heraldry and traditions

Coat of arms
The coat of the arms of the Air Tactical Center 1994–1997. Blazon: "Chequey or and azure, a chief azure charged with a winged two-bladed propeller or."

The coat of the arms of the Air Component Command 2007–2018. It was used by Air Staff 1937–1994, the Air Force Command 1994–1997, the Air Force Tactical Center 1997–1998, the Air Force Center 1998–2000 and the Air Force Tactical Command 2000–2007. Blazon: "Azure, a winged two-bladed propeller or".

Commanding officers

Flygvapenledningen (1994–1998)

Chiefs
1 July 1994–30 30 September 1994: Lieutenant general Lars-Erik Englund
1 October 1994–30 June 1998: Lieutenant general Kent Harrskog

Deputy Chiefs
1995–1997: Senior colonel Curt Westberg

Flygvapnets taktiska centrum (1994–1998)

Chiefs
1994–1997: Jan Jonsson
1997–2000: Anders Johansson
2000–2000: Lennart Brodin

Flygvapencentrum (1998–2000)

Chiefs
1 July 1998–30 June 2000: Major general Jan Jonsson

Deputy Chiefs
1998–2000: Senior colonel Owe Wagermark

Flygtaktiska kommandot (2000–2007)

Chiefs
1 July 2000–1 December 2002: Major general Mats Nilsson
1 January 2003–2006: Brigadier general Lennart Pettersson
2006–2007: Brigadier general Anders Silwer

Deputy Chiefs
2000–2002: Brigadier general Jan Andersson
2003–2004: Colonel Anders Silwer
2004–2007: Colonel Bengt Christer Olofsson

Flygtaktiska stabsledningen (2007–2018)

Chiefs
2007–2008: Major general Jan Andersson
2008–2011: Major general Anders Silwer
2012–2013: Major general Micael Bydén
2013–2013: Colonel Anders Persson (acting between 14 October 2013 and 31 December 2013)
2013–2018: Brigdadier general Gabor Nagy
2018–2018: Brigdadier general Carl-Johan Edström

Deputy Chiefs
2007–2008: Major general Anders Silwer
2008–2009: Brigadier general Johan Svensson

Names, designations and locations

Footnotes

References

Notes

Print

Staff (military)
Military units and formations of the Swedish Air Force
Military units and formations established in 1994
Military units and formations disestablished in 2018
Commands of the Swedish Armed Forces
Disbanded units and formations of Sweden
1994 establishments in Sweden
2018 disestablishments in Sweden
Stockholm Garrison
Uppsala Garrison